Rebel Ridge is an upcoming American thriller film written and directed by Jeremy Saulnier. It stars Aaron Pierre, Don Johnson, James Badge Dale, James Cromwell, AnnaSophia Robb and Emory Cohen.

Cast
Aaron Pierre
Don Johnson
James Badge Dale
James Cromwell
AnnaSophia Robb
Emory Cohen
Zsane Jhe
David Denman

Production
It was announced in November 2019 that John Boyega was cast in the film, written and directed by Jeremy Saulnier. Don Johnson, Erin Doherty, James Badge Dale, Zsane Jhe and James Cromwell were added to the cast in February 2020. In April 2021, AnnaSophia Robb, and Emory Cohen joined the cast of the film, with Robb replacing Doherty.

Filming was slated to begin in April 2020 in Louisiana, but was postponed due to the COVID-19 pandemic. Principal photography eventually began in Louisiana on May 3, 2021. In June 2021, Boyega left the project during filming due to "family reasons". Filming paused as a result in order to find a replacement for Boyega. It was later reported that Boyega had allegedly abandoned the project due to a variety of reasons, including his dissatisfaction with the script and his accommodations. He denied any allegations. In October, Aaron Pierre was cast to replace Boyega, with Zsane Jhe also joining the cast. Filming was due to resume in early 2022.

In April 2022, David Denman was added to the cast, before production restarted on April 25. Production wrapped shooting on July 24.

References

External links
 

Upcoming films
American thriller films
Films directed by Jeremy Saulnier
Upcoming Netflix original films
Film productions suspended due to the COVID-19 pandemic